1852 election may refer to:
1852 French legislative election
1852 United Kingdom general election
1852 United States presidential election
1852 United States House of Representatives elections